The Hong Kong Open is an annual badminton tournament held in Hong Kong since 1982, but it did not take place annually. It is organized by Hong Kong Badminton Association and it became one of the Super Series tournament in 2007. In 2008, Wang Chen became the first home player to win the Hong Kong Open title.

BWF categorised Hong Kong Open as one of the seven BWF World Tour Super 500 events in the BWF events structure since 2018.

Past winners

Performances by nation 

Notes:

*  = No Mixed doubles competition at 1982

References

External links
Hong Kong Badminton Association
Champions of the Hong Kong Opens

 
Badminton tournaments in China
Badminton in Hong Kong
International sports competitions hosted by Hong Kong
1982 establishments in Hong Kong
Recurring sporting events established in 1982